Terri J. Stoneburner (born 1945) is an American lawyer and judge from the U.S. state of Minnesota. She is a former judge of the Minnesota Court of Appeals.

Education and career
Stoneburner earned her undergraduate degree from Hanover College in 1967. She earned her J.D. from the University of Washington Law School in 1972.

Stoneburner worked as a staff attorney for the Alaska Commission for Human Rights from 1977 to 1979. She then worked as a professor of women's studies and political science at Minnesota State University, Mankato then called Mankato State University in Minnesota. Stoneburner also joined Farrish, Johnson, Maschka Attorneys at Law in Mankato, becoming a partner in 1984.

Stoneburner was appointed to the fifth district court by Rudy Perpich in April 1990. She was appointed to the Court of Appeals by Jesse Ventura in 2000. She retired on April 1, 2014.

References

Living people
Minnesota lawyers
Minnesota Court of Appeals judges
University of Washington School of Law alumni
1945 births
20th-century American judges
21st-century American judges